Lambda Columbae, Latinized from λ Columbae, is a probable binary star in the southern constellation of Columba. With an apparent visual magnitude of 4.86, it is faintly visible to the naked eye. The measured annual parallax shift of 9.75 mas yields an estimated distance of roughly 335 light years.

Lambda Columbae has a stellar classification of B5 V, indicating that it is a B-type main sequence star. It is a suspected rotating ellipsoidal variable with a period of 0.64 days and an amplitude of 0.07 magnitude. Confirmation would indicate that this is a close binary system. It has an estimated age of around 57 million years.

From this Chinese name, the name Tsze is derived.

References

B-type main-sequence stars
Columba (constellation)
Columbae, Lambda
Durchmusterung objects
039764
027810
02056